

Notes
 Cities marked with * have several different post codes, the one here is only the most general one.

 
Hungary